Zingoni is a surname. Notable people with the surname include:

Alphose Zingoni (born 1962), Zimbabwean-South African engineer
Pete Zingoni (born 1981), American ice hockey player

See also
Zigoni